Johann Nepomuk Hummel wrote his Concerto a Trombe Principale (Trumpet Concerto in E Major) for Viennese trumpet virtuoso and inventor of the keyed trumpet, Anton Weidinger (as had Joseph Haydn).  It was written in December 1803 and performed on New Year's Day 1804 to mark Hummel's entrance into the court orchestra of Nikolaus II, Prince Esterházy as Haydn's successor.  There are places, primarily in the second movement, where Weidinger is believed to have changed the music because of the execution of the instrument.  It is unknown whether this was in agreement with Hummel.

Originally this piece was written in E major. The piece is often performed in E-flat major, which makes the fingering less difficult on modern E-flat and B-flat trumpets.

A typical performance lasts around 17 minutes.

Form

The work is composed in three movements (typical of a concerto) and they are marked as follows:
 I. Allegro con spirito
 II. Andante
 III. Rondo

Instrumentation
The work is scored for trumpet solo, flute, 2 oboes, 2 clarinets, 2 horns, timpani and strings.

See also
Joseph Haydn also wrote a trumpet concerto for Anton Weidinger.

Notes

External links
MIDI files
Hummel Trumpet Concerto - Maurice André, Ozawa, London Symphony Orchestra
 John A. Rice, "The Musical Bee: References to Mozart and Cherubini in Hummel's 'New Year' Concerto

1803 compositions
Compositions by Johann Nepomuk Hummel
Hummel
Compositions in E major